Napoleone Pini (1835, Milan - 22 March 1907, Milan) was an Italian zoologist and palaeontologist.

Pini was born into an aristocratic family. He was an accountant. In 1872 he became a member of the Società Entomologica Italiana. In 1873 he was appointed member of the Società Italiana di Scienze Naturali di Milano. In this Society he was Secretary since 1878. He was also a member of the Società Malacologica Italiana (1875-1895).

The terrestrial molluscs were always his main interest. He specially studied the slugs of Lombardy. He wrote 17 works of malacology, in addition to a report on the Phylloxera, the description of  Cychrus cylindricollis, Acme elegantissima and the collection of specimen for anatomical studies on  Limax doriae.

Pini's mollusc collections were destroyed when Museo Civico di Storia Naturale di Milano was damaged in 1943 by Allied bombings. His Coleoptera collections are held by Museo Civico di Storia Naturale di Genova, while a collection of 100 series of molluscs from southern Italy is held by Natural History Museum of Bern.

Works
Pini, N., 1871 - Descrizione di un nuovo carabico appartenente al genere Cychrus Fabr. Atti Soc. It. Sc. Nat 14, p. 224-227
Pini, N., 1874 - Sopra una nuova Campylaea del gruppo della Helix cingulata Studer  Atti Soc. It. Sc. Nat 17, p. 41-54
Pini, N., 1874 - Osservazioni critiche alle osservazioni e rettifiche del Prof. P. Strobel Atti Soc. It. Sc. Nat 17, p. 421-431
Pini, N., 1875 - Clausilia Spreafici Pini   Bull. Soc. Mal. It. 1, p. 164-165.
Pini, N., 1876 - Molluschi terrestri e d'acqua dolce viventi nel territorio d'Esino Bull. Soc. Mal. It. 2, 67-206, 2 tavv.
Pini, N., 1876 -  Notizie malacologiche relative alla fauna lombarda Atti Soc. It. Sc. nat. 19, p. 493-499
Pini, N., 1878 - Nuove specie o forme poco note di Molluschi. Contribuzione alla Fauna malacologica d'Italia Atti Soc. It. Sc. Nat. 21, p. 612-628.
Pini, N., 1878 - Contribuzione alla fauna fossile postpliocenica della Lombardia Atti Soc. It. Sc. Nat. 21, p. 774-779
Pini, N., 1879 - Appunti malacologici. Sopra alcune forme di conchiglie italiane pubblicate come nuove specie nel Vol. V del Bullettino della Società Malacologica Italiana Atti Soc. It. Sc. Nat. 22, p. 156-175
Pini, N., 1879 - Relazione annuale della Commissione di sorveglianza contro la Fillossera, sul servizio delle vedette nell'anno 1879  Atti Soc. It. Sc. nat. XXII, 337.
Pini, N., 1879 -  Argomentazioni di Napoleone Pini sulle due parole del Dott. Carlo De Stefani intorno ad alcune Clausilie toscane Bull. Soc. Mal. It. 5, 237-261.
Pini, N., 1883 -  Nuova contribuzione alla fauna fossile postpliocenica della Lombardia Atti Soc. It. Sc. Nat. 26, p. 48-70
Pini, N., 1883 - Nuove forme di Clausilie italiane Atti Soc. It. Sc. Nat. 26, p. 137 - 143
Pini, N., 1883 - Un po' di luce sulla Hyalina obscurata Porro  Atti Soc. It. Sc. Nat. 26, p. 389-404
Pini, N., 1884 - Note malacologiche sulla fauna italiana  Atti Soc. It. Sc. Nat. 27, p. 79 - 87
Pini, N. 1884 - Novità malacologiche Atti Soc. It. Sc. Nat. 27, p. 230-256)
Pini, N., 1884 - Novità malacologiche. 2a Nota. Atti Soc. It. Sc. Nat. 27, p. 368-382, tav. 12]
Pini, N. 1885 - Due nuove forme di Helix italiane del gruppo della Variabilis Drap.  Atti Soc. It. Sc. Nat. 28, p. 165-168
Pini, N., 1886 - Nuova forma di Acme italiana (Acme elegantissima Pini) - Atti Soc. It. Sc. Nat. 29, p. 521-522

References
 Cesare Conci et Roberto Poggi (1996), Iconography of Italian Entomologists, with essential biographical data.Memorie della Società entomologica Italiana, 75 : 159-382. 
 Eugenio Bettoni, Prodromi della faunistica Bresciana, Appollonio, 1884.
 Cianfanelli and Manganelli - "A bibliography of Marianna Paulucci"

External links
Atti della Società Italiana di Scienze Naturali at Animalbase.
Natura Mediterraneo

Italian zoologists
Italian entomologists
1835 births
1907 deaths